Chapalania is a genus of mites in the family Laelapidae.

Species
 Chapalania cifuentesi Hoffmann & Lopez-Campos, 1995

References

Laelapidae